The Copa del Rey 2005-06 was the 70th edition of the Spanish basketball Cup. It was organized by the ACB and was disputed in Madrid in the Palacio de Deportes de la Comunidad de Madrid between the 16th and 19 February. The winning team was TAU Cerámica.

Brackett

Quarterfinals

Semifinals

Final

MVP of the Tournament: Pablo Prigioni

See also
Liga ACB
Copa del Rey de Baloncesto

External links
2005/2006 Copa del Rey Official Website 

Copa del Rey de Baloncesto
2005–06 in Spanish basketball cups
2006 in Madrid